Sino-Ocean Group Holding Limited is an investment holding company that engages in the property investment and development activities in the People's Republic of China. The company develops real estate projects such as mid to high-end residential properties and also invests in and operates urban complexes, office buildings.

It also provides property management. For instance, its service includes community O2O and equity investment. In addition, the company is involved in the logistic property, real estate financing, pension, real estate fund, and environmental technology businesses.

The company was formerly known as Sino-Ocean Land Holdings Limited and changed its name to Sino-Ocean Group Holding Limited in May 2016.

See also
Real estate in China

References

External links

Companies listed on the Hong Kong Stock Exchange
Companies based in Beijing
Real estate companies of China
Government-owned companies of China
Companies in the Hang Seng China-Affiliated Corporations Index
COSCO Shipping
Sinochem Group